Pinky Moge Wali (2012) is a Punjabi film starring Neeru Bajwa, Gavie Chahal, Geeta Zaildar, K S Makhan, Harpal Singh, B.N. Sharma as the prominent characters.
Music for the film will be given by Jatinder Shah, Gurmeet Singh & Rohit Composer and Guri Bal. The film started shooting in March 2012. The Movie was released on 28 September 2012.

The film's title Pinky Moge Wali comes from the popular character of Pinky introduced in the popular Punjabi movie Jihne Mera Dil Luteya. The title for the movie was bought for an undisclosed amount in big figures.

Cast

 Gavie Chahal as Raj
 Neeru Bajwa as Pinky
 K S Makhan as Akaal
 Geeta Zaildar as Billu
 B.N. Sharma as Aatma Singh
 Rana Jung Bahadur as Parmattma Singh
 Harpal Singh as Sherdil Singh
 Avtar Gill as SSP Gill
 Shavinder Mahal as Pratap Singh Bajwa
 Dhriti Saharan in the song Thumka

Production budget - 3.5 crores

Marketing budget - 50 lakhs

Soundtrack

Track listing

References

Punjabi-language Indian films
2010s Punjabi-language films
2012 films
Films scored by Jatinder Shah